Lambda Beta Society is a national honor society sponsored and maintained by the National Board for Respiratory Care (NBRC).  It is an honor society specifically recognizing undergraduate achievement in Respiratory Care related colleges.  Lambda Beta Society was formed in 1986 and has over 100 chapters in the United States as of 2011.  Membership requires the undergraduate student to be a student of respiratory care and be in the top 25 percentile of their class.

Etymology
The name was chosen to represent sustaining “life and breath”.
Lambda (Λ) is the Greek letter “L”, and beta (Β) is the Greek letter “B”.

See also
Respiratory therapy

References

Pulmonology and respiratory therapy organizations
Respiratory therapy
Medical and health organizations based in Kansas
Honor societies
Student organizations established in 1986
1986 establishments in Kansas
Medical associations based in the United States